China Resources Power Holdings Company Limited (commonly known as CR Power) was incorporated and registered in Hong Kong in 2001. It is a subsidiary of China Resources Holdings, a conglomerate in Mainland China and Hong Kong. Its business is concerned about the investment, development, operation and management of coal-burning power plants in the regions including Beijing, Hebei, Henan, Liaoning, Shandong, Jiangsu, Anhui, Zhejiang, Hubei, Hunan, Guangdong and Yunnan.

China Resources Power was added to be Hang Seng Index Constituent Stock on 8 June 2009 to replace Yue Yuen Industrial.

References

External links

China Resources Power Holdings Company Limited

Companies listed on the Hong Kong Stock Exchange
Government-owned companies of China
Electric power companies of China
China Resources